Zupko is a surname. Notable people with the surname include:

 Ronald Edward Zupko, American historian, metrologist
 John Alexander Zupko, author of Jean Buridan's Philosophy of Mind
 Ramon Zupko, winner of the 1980 Kennedy Center Friedheim Award
 Sarah Zupko, founder of PopMatters (webzine)